Jean-Marie Forest, 4 February 1752 Lyon (Rhone) – 12 June 1799 Modena was a general of the French Revolution.

Service record 

Forest entered service on 31 August 1768 in the dragoons Custine's dragoon regiment (the future 2nd cavalry); he became brigadier 17 September 1777, quartermaster 15 April 1783, and Warrant Officer 1 October 1784. On May 1, 1788, he was a sous-lieutenant, lieutenant on 15 September 1791, and captain on 15 September 1792 .  He served in that capacity in the campaigns of 1792–1793 at the Army of the Rhine, and was appointed squadron leader on 12 October 1793.

He was promoted to brigadier general (provisionally) 11 June 1794, it was confirmed in grade 29 November 1794.  He campaigned from 1794 to 1796, the armies of the Rhine and the Army of the Rhine and Moselle, where he commanded the Reserves, two brigades of cavalry and a brigade of mixed infantry, under overall command of François_Antoine_Louis_Bourcier. He retired at the conclusion of that campaign in 1797 but on 4 May 1798, he was recalled to service and sent to northern Italy, where he commanded a cavalry brigade under the orders of Championnet.  He was distinguished by his bravery at the head of the 7th and 25th regiments of curaissiers in battle on December 15, 1798, and the next night he repulsed an attempted surprise attack by the enemy on the door St. John Lateran in Rome.

25 February  1799, he led a saber charge at the San Severo, and died 12 June 1799, at the Battle of Modena.

References

French generals
French Republican military leaders of the French Revolutionary Wars
1799 deaths
1752 births
Military personnel from Lyon